Ivan Lučić (born 23 March 1995) is an Austrian professional footballer who plays as a goalkeeper for Hajduk Split.

Club career

Youth years in Austria 
Lučić began playing football when he was nine years old at the Viennese club Post SV in 2004. In 2006, he moved to FC Stadlau before entering the youth teams of Austria Vienna in 2008. After four years at die Veilchen, Lučić joined Austrian Bundesliga side SV Ried prior to the 2012–13 season. Eventually, he made his professional debut for Ried on 11 May 2014 in the last match of the 2013–14 season, a 2–5 home defeat against Rapid Vienna, where he played 89 minutes.

In order to receive more playing time, he was loaned to Austrian Regional League Central team Union St. Florian for the 2013–14 season. Lučić debuted for the club on the first day of the season in a 3–0 win against SAK Klagenfurt. Late in the season, he was also able to score two goals for St. Florian, one via penalty kick in a home loss against Kapfenberger SV reserves on 2 May 2014 and one via a converted direct free kick in a home win against Union Vöcklamarkt on 16 May 2014.

Bayern Munich 
Prior to the 2014–15 season, Lučić was transferred to German Regionalliga Bayern club FC Bayern Munich II, the reserve team of FC Bayern Munich. His first appearance for his new club was in a home loss against Würzburger Kickers on 11 July 2014. Soon thereafter, he was invited to join the professional team in their training camp in the United States. However, Lučić suffered a sprained ankle during the camp which sidelined him for several months. He returned to action for Bayern II on 10 April 2015. A few days later, first-team coach Pep Guardiola added him to the squad for the first leg of the 2014–15 UEFA Champions League quarterfinal against FC Porto.

Bristol City 
On 27 July 2016, Lučić signed for Bristol City for an undisclosed fee, following a successful trial. Lučić made his Bristol City debut in a 2–1 EFL Cup win against Fulham on 21 September 2016, a game in which he saved a Cauley Woodrow penalty.

Lučić had his contract at the club cancelled by mutual consent on 31 January 2018, making two appearances for the club.

AaB (loan) 
Lučić was loaned out to Danish Superliga-side AaB on 28 January 2017 for the rest of the season.

International career 
Born in Austria, Lučić is of Croatian descent. Lučić made his international debut for the Austria national youth football team in an under-16 match against Hungary at Bruck an der Leitha on 28 September 2010. His only under-17 team appearance came on 11 January 2011 against Portugal at Miróbriga. The first of four under-18 appearances was a match against the German under-17 team at Waldkraiburg on 14 April 2012. Lučić then debuted for the Austrian under-19 side against Northern Ireland at Vienna on 11 September 2013 and was subsequentially added to the squad for the 2014 UEFA European Under-19 Championship, where he played in two group stage matches against Hungary and Israel and in the semifinal against Germany.

Career statistics

1.Includes Austrian Cup.

References

External links
 
 

1995 births
Living people
Austrian footballers
Austria youth international footballers
Austria under-21 international footballers
Austrian people of Croatian descent
Austrian expatriate footballers
Association football goalkeepers
SV Ried players
FC Bayern Munich II players
FC Bayern Munich footballers
Bristol City F.C. players
AaB Fodbold players
FK Austria Wien players
NK Istra 1961 players
HNK Hajduk Split players
Austrian Football Bundesliga players
Regionalliga players
English Football League players
Croatian Football League players
Expatriate footballers in Germany
Expatriate footballers in England
Expatriate men's footballers in Denmark
Expatriate footballers in Croatia
Footballers from Vienna